Biobased economy, bioeconomy or biotechonomy is economic activity involving the use of biotechnology and biomass in the production of goods, services, or energy. The terms are widely used by regional development agencies, national and international organizations, and biotechnology companies. They are closely linked to the evolution of the biotechnology industry and the capacity to study, understand, and manipulate genetic material that has been possible due to scientific research and technological development. This includes the application of scientific and technological developments to agriculture, health, chemical, and energy industries. The terms bioeconomy (BE) and bio-based economy (BBE) are sometimes used interchangeably. However, it is worth to distinguish them: the biobased economy takes into consideration the production of non-food goods, whilst bioeconomy covers both bio-based economy and the production and use of food and feed. More than 60 countries and regions have bioeconomy or bioscience-related strategies, of which 20 have published dedicated bioeconomy strategies in Africa, Asia, Europe, Oceania, and the Americas.

Definitions
Bioeconomy has large variety of definitions. The bioeconomy comprises those parts of the economy that use renewable biological resources from land and sea – such as crops, forests, fish, animals and micro-organisms – to produce food, health, materials, products, textiles and energy. The definitions and usage does however vary between different areas of the world. 

An important aspect of the bioeconomy is understanding mechanisms and processes at the genetic, molecular, and genomic levels, and applying this understanding to creating or improving industrial processes, developing new products and services, and producing new energy. Bioeconomy aims to reduce our dependence on fossil natural resources, to prevent biodiversity loss and to create new economic growth and jobs that are in line with the principles of sustainable development.

Earlier definitions
The term 'biotechonomy' was used by Juan Enríquez and Rodrigo Martinez at the Genomics Seminar in the 1997 AAAS meeting. An excerpt of this paper was published in Science."

In 2010 it was defined in the report "The Knowledge Based Bio-Economy (KBBE) in Europe: Achievements and Challenges" by Albrecht & al. as follows: The bio-economy is the sustainable production and conversion of biomass, for a range of food, health, fibre and industrial products and energy, where renewable biomass encompasses any biological material to be used as raw material.”

According to a 2013 study, "the bioeconomy can be defined as an economy where the basic building blocks for materials, chemicals and energy are derived from renewable biological resources".

The First Global Bioeconomy Summit in Berlin in November 2015 defines bioeconomy as "knowledge-based production and utilization of biological resources, biological processes and principles to sustainably provide goods and services across all economic sectors". According to the summit, bioeconomy involves three elements: renewable biomass, enabling and converging technologies, and integration across applications concerning primary production (i.e. all living natural resources), health (i.e. pharmaceuticals and medical devices), and industry (i.e. chemicals, plastics, enzymes, pulp and paper, bioenergy).

History
Enríquez and Martinez' 2002 Harvard Business School working paper, "Biotechonomy 1.0: A Rough Map of Biodata Flow", showed the global flow of genetic material into and out of the three largest public genetic databases: GenBank, EMBL and DDBJ. The authors then hypothesized about the economic impact that such data flows might have on patent creation, evolution of biotech startups and licensing fees. An adaptation of this paper was published in Wired magazine in 2003.

The term 'bioeconomy' became popular from the mid-2000s with its adoption by the European Union and Organisation for Economic Co-operation and Development as a policy agenda and framework to promote the use of biotechnology to develop new products, markets, and uses of biomass. Since then, both the EU (2012) and OECD (2006) have created dedicated bioeconomy strategies, as have an increasing number of countries around the world. Often these strategies conflate the bioeconomy with the term 'bio-based economy'. For example, since 2005 the Netherlands has sought to promote the creation of a biobased economy. Pilot plants have been started i.e. in Lelystad (Zeafuels), and a centralised organisation exists (Interdepartementaal programma biobased economy), with supporting research (Food & Biobased Research) being conducted. Other European countries have also developed and implemented bioeconomy or bio-based economy policy strategies and frameworks.

In 2012 president Barack Obama of the USA announced intentions to encourage biological manufacturing methods, with a National Bioeconomy Blueprint.

Aims
Global population growth and over consumption of many resources are causing increasing environmental pressure and climate change. Bioeconomy tackles with these challenges. It aims to ensure food security and to promote more sustainable natural resource use as well as to reduce the dependence on non-renewable resources, e.g. fossil natural resources and minerals. In some extent bioeconomy also helps economy to reduces greenhouse gas emissions and assists in mitigating and adapting to climate change.

Genetic modification 

Organisms, ranging from bacteria over yeasts up to plants are used for production of enzymatic catalysis. Genetically modified bacteria have been used to produce insulin, artemisinic acid was made in engineered yeast. Some bioplastics (based on polyhydroxylbutyrate or polyhydroxylalkanoates are produced from sugar using genetically modified microbes.

Genetically modified organisms are also used for the production of biofuels. Biofuels are a type of carbon-neutral fuel.

Research is also being done towards CO2 fixation using a synthetic metabolic pathway. By genetically modifying E. coli bacteria so as to allow them to consume CO2, the bacterium may provide the infrastructure for the future renewable production of food and green fuels.

One of the organisms (Ideonella sakaiensis) that is able to break down PET (a plastic) into other substances has been genetically modified to break down PET even faster and also break down PEF. Once plastics (which are normally non-biodegradable) are broken down and recycled into other substances (i.e. biomatter in the case of Tenebrio molitor larvae) it can be used as an input for other animals.

Genetically modified crops are also used. Genetically modified energy crops for instance may provide some additional advantages such as reduced associated costs (i.e. costs during the manufacturing process ) and less water use. One example are trees have been genetically modified to either have less lignin, or to express lignin with chemically labile bonds.

With genetically modified crops however, there are still some challenges involved (hurdles to regulatory approvals, market adoption and public acceptance).

Fields 
According to European Union Bioeconomy Strategy updated in 2018 the bioeconomy covers all sectors and systems that rely on biological resources (animals, plants, micro-organisms and derived biomass, including organic waste), their functions and principles. It covers all primary production and economic and industrial sectors that base on use, production or processing biological resources from agriculture, forestry, fisheries and aquaculture. The product of bioeconomy are typically food, feed and other biobased products, bioenergy and services based on biological resources. The bioeconomy aims to drive towards sustainability, circularity as well as the protection of the environment and will enhance biodiversity.

In some definitions, bioeconomy comprises also ecosystem services that are services offered by the environment, including binding carbon dioxide and opportunities for recreation. Another key aspect of the bioeconomy is not wasting natural resources but using and recycling them efficiently.

According to EU Bioeconomy Report 2016, the bioeconomy brings together various sectors of the economy that produce, process and reuse renewable biological resources (agriculture, forestry, fisheries, food, bio-based chemicals and materials and bioenergy).

Agriculture

However, not all synthetic nutrition products are animal food products such as meat and dairy – for instance, as of 2021 there are also products of synthetic coffee that are reported to be close to commercialization. Similar fields of research and production based on bioeconomy agriculture are:

 Microbial food cultures and genetically engineered microbial production (e.g. of spider silk or solar-energy-based protein powder)
 Controlled self-assembly of plant proteins (e.g. of spider silk similar plant-proteins-based plastics alternatives)
 Cell-free artificial synthesis (e.g. of starch)
 Bioproduced imitation foods (e.g. meat analogues and milk substitutes)

Many of the foods produced with tools and methods of the bioeconomy may not be intended for human consumption but for non-human animals such as for livestock feed, insect-based pet food or sustainable aquacultural feed. There are various startups and research teams around the world who use synthetic biology to create animal feed.

Moreover, crops could be genetically engineered in ways that e.g. safely increase yields, reduce the need for pesticides or ease indoor production.

One example of a product highly specific to the bioeconomy that is widely available is algae oil which is a dietary supplement that could substitute possibly less sustainable, larger-market-share fish oil supplements.

Vertical farming

Fungiculture

For example, there is ongoing research and development for indoor high-yield mechanisms.

Mycoprotein

Algaculture

Waste management, recycling and biomining 

Biobased applications, research and development of waste management may form a part of the bioeconomy. Bio-based recycling (e-waste, plastics recycling, etc.) is linked to waste management and relevant standards and requirements of production and products. Some of the recycling of waste may be biomining and some biomining could be applied beyond recycling.

For example, in 2020, biotechnologists reported the genetically engineered refinement and mechanical description of synergistic enzymes – PETase, first discovered in 2016, and MHETase of Ideonella sakaiensis – for faster depolymerization of PET and also of PEF, which may be useful for depollution, recycling and upcycling of mixed plastics along with other approaches. Such approaches may be more environmentally-friendly as well as cost-effective than mechanical and chemical PET-recycling, enabling circular plastic bio-economy solutions via systems based on engineered strains. Moreover, microorganisms could be employed to mine useful elements from basalt rocks via bioleaching.

Medicine, nutritional science and the health economy 

In 2020, the global industry for dietary supplements was valued at $140.3 billion by a "Grand View Research" analysis. Certain parts of the health economy may overlap with the bioeconomy, including anti-aging- and life extension-related products and activities, hygiene/beauty products, functional food, sports performance related products and bio-based tests (such as of one's microbiota) and banks (such as stool banks including oral "super stool" capsules) and databases (mainly DNA databases), all of which can in turn be used for individualized interventions, monitoring as well as for the development of new products. The pharmaceutical sector, including the research and development of new antibiotics, can also be considered to be a bioeconomy sector.

Forest bioeconomy

The forest bioeconomy is based on forests and their natural resources, and covers a variety of different industry and production processes. Forest bioeconomy includes, for example, the processing of forest biomass to provide products relating to, energy, chemistry, or the food industry. Thus, forest bioeconomy covers a variety of different manufacturing processes that are based on wood material and the range of end products is wide.

Besides different wood-based products, recreation, nature tourism and game are a crucial part of forest bioeconomy. Carbon sequestration and ecosystem services are also included in the concept of forest bioeconomy.

Pulp, paper, packaging materials and sawn timber are the traditional products of the forest industry. Wood is also traditionally used in furniture and construction industries. But in addition to these, as a renewable natural resource, ingredients from wood can be valorised into innovative bioproducts alongside a range of conventional forest industry products. Thus, traditional mill sites of large forest industry companies, for example in Finland, are in the process of becoming biorefineries. In different processes, forest biomass is used to produce textiles, chemicals, cosmetics, fuels, medicine, intelligent packaging, coatings, glues, plastics, food and feed.

Blue bioeconomy 

The blue bioeconomy covers businesses that are based on the sustainable use of renewable aquatic resources as well water related expertise areas. It covers the development and marketing of blue bioeconomy products and services. In that respect, the key sectors include business activities based on water expertise and technology, water-based tourism, making use of aquatic biomass, and the value chain of fisheries. Furthermore, the immaterial value of aquatic natural resources is also very high. Water areas have also other values beyond being platforms of economic activities. It provides human well-being, recreation and health.

According to the European Union the blue bioeconomy has the focus on aquatic or marine environments, especially, on novel aquaculture applications, including non-food, food and feed.

In the European Report on the Blue Growth Strategy - Towards more sustainable growth and jobs in the blue economy (2017) the blue bioeconomy is defined differently to the blue economy. The blue economy means the industries that are related to marine environment activities, e.g. shipbuilding, transport, coastal tourism, renewable energies (such as off-shore windmills), living and non-living resources.

Energy 

The bioeconomy also includes bioenergy, biohydrogen, biofuel and algae fuel.

According to World Bioenergy Association 17.8 % out of gross final energy consumption was covered with renewable energy. Among renewable energy sources, bioenergy (energy from bio-based sources) is the largest renewable energy source. In 2017, bioenergy accounted for 70% of renewable energy consumption.

The role of bioenergy varies in different countries and continents. In Africa it is the most important energy sources with the share of 96%. Bioenergy has significant shares in energy production in the Americas (59%), Asia (65%) and Europe (59%). The bioenergy is produced out of a large variety of biomass from forestry, agriculture and waste and side streams of industries to produce useful end products (pellets, wood chips, bioethanol, biogas and biodiesel) for electricity, heat and transportation fuel around the world.

Biomass is a renewable natural resource but it is still a limited resource. Globally there are huge resources, but environmental, social and economic aspects limit their use. Biomass can play an important role for low-carbon solutions in the fields of customer supplies, energy, food and feed. In practice, there are many competing uses.

The biobased economy uses first-generation biomass (crops), second-generation biomass (crop refuge), and third-generation biomass (seaweed, algae). Several methods of processing are then used (in biorefineries) to gather the most out of the biomass. This includes techniques such as
 Anaerobic digestion
 Pyrolysis
 Torrefaction
 Fermentation

Anaerobic digestion is generally used to produce biogas, fermentation of sugars produces ethanol, pyrolysis is used to produce pyrolysis-oil (which is solidified biogas), and torrefaction is used to create biomass-coal. Biomass-coal and biogas is then burnt for energy production, ethanol can be used as a (vehicle)-fuel, as well as for other purposes, such as skincare products.

Biobased energy can be used to manage intermittency of variable renewable energy like solar and wind.

Woodchips and pellets

Getting the most out of the biomass
For economic reasons, the processing of the biomass is done according to a specific pattern (a process called cascading). This pattern depends on the types of biomass used. The whole of finding the most suitable pattern is known as biorefining. A general list shows the products with high added value and lowest volume of biomass to the products with the lowest added value and highest volume of biomass:
 fine chemicals/medicines
 food
 chemicals/bioplastics
 transport fuels
 electricity and heat

Other fields and applications 

Bioproducts or bio-based products are products that are made from biomass. The term “bioproduct” refers to a wide array of industrial and commercial products that are characterized by a variety of properties, compositions and processes, as well as different benefits and risks.

Bio-based products are developed in order to reduce dependency on fossil fuels and non-renewable resources. To achieve this, the key is to develop new bio-refining technologies to sustainably transform renewable natural resources into bio-based products, materials and fuels, e.g.

Transplantable organs and induced regeneration

Microtechnology (medicine and energy)

Climate change adaptation and mitigation 

Activities and technologies for bio-based climate change adaptation could be considered as part of the bioeconomy. Examples may include:
 reforestation (alongside forest protection) 
 algaculture carbon sequestration 
 artificial assistance to make coral reefs more resilient against climate change
 restoration of seagrass, mangroves and salt marshes

Materials 
There is a potential for biobased-production of building materials (insulation, surface materials, etc.) as well as new materials in general (polymers, plastics, composites, etc.). Photosynthetic microbial cells have been used as a step to synthetic production of spider silk.

Bioplastics 
Bioplastics are not just one single material. They comprise a whole family of materials with different properties and applications. According to European Bioplastics, a plastic material is defined as a bioplastic if it is either bio-based plastic, biodegradable plastic, or is a material with both properties. Bioplastics have the same properties as conventional plastics and offer additional advantages, such as a reduced carbon footprint or additional waste management options, such as composting.

Bioplastics are divided into three main groups:
 Bio-based or partially bio-based non-biodegradable plastics such as bio-based PE, PP, or PET (so-called drop-ins) and bio-based technical performance polymers such as PTT or TPC-ET
 Plastics that are both bio-based and biodegradable, such as PLA and PHA or PBS
 Plastics that are based on fossil resources and are biodegradable, such as PBAT

Additionally, new materials such as PLA, PHA, cellulose or starch-based materials offer solutions with completely new functionalities such as biodegradability and compostability, and in some cases optimized barrier properties. Along with the growth in variety of bioplastic materials, properties such as flexibility, durability, printability, transparency, barrier, heat resistance, gloss and many more have been significantly enhanced.

Bioplastics have been made from sugarbeet, by bacteria.

Examples of bioplastics 
 Paptic: There are packaging materials which combine the qualities of paper and plastic. For example, Paptic is produced from wood-based fibre that contains more than 70% wood. The material is formed with foam-forming technology that saves raw material and improves the qualities of the material. The material can be produced as reels, which enables it to be delivered with existing mills. The material is spatter-proof but is decomposed when put under water. It is more durable than paper and maintains its shape better than plastic. The material is recycled with cardboards.

Examples of bio-composites 
 Sulapac tins are made from wood chips and biodegradable natural binder and they have features similar to plastic. These packaging products tolerate water and fats, and they do not allow oxygen to pass. Sulapac products combine ecology, luxury and are not subject to design limitations. Sulapac can compete with traditional plastic tins by cost and is suitable for the same packing devices.
 Woodio produces wood composite sinks and other bathroom furniture. The composite is produced by moulding a mixture of wood chips and crystal clear binder. Woodio has developed a solid wood composite that is entirely waterproof. The material has similar features to ceramic, but can be used for producing energy at the end of its lifespan, unlike ceramic waste. Solid wood composite is hard and can be moulded with wooden tools.
 Woodcast is a renewable and biodegradable casting material. It is produced from woodchips and biodegradable plastic. It is hard and durable in room temperature but when heated is flexible and self-sticky. Woodcast can be applied to all plastering and supporting elements. The material is breathable and X-ray transparent. It is used in plastering and in occupational therapy and can be moulded to any anatomical shape. Excess pieces can be reused: used casts can be disposed of either as energy or biowaste. The composite differs from traditional lime cast in that it doesn’t need water and it is non-toxic. Therefore gas-masks, gauntlets or suction fans are not required when handling the cast.

For sustainable packaging

Textiles 

The textile industry, or certain activities and elements of it, could be considered to be a strong global bioeconomy sector. Textiles are produced from natural fibres, regenerated fibres and synthetic fibres (Sinclair 2014). The natural fibre textile industry is based on cotton, linen, bamboo, hemp, wool, silk, angora, mohair and cashmere.

Activities related to textile production and processing that more clearly fall under the domain of the bioeconomy are developments such as the biofabrication of leather-like material using fungi, fungal cotton substitutes, and renewable fibers from fungal cell walls.

Textile fibres can be formed in chemical processes from bio-based materials. These fibres are called bio-based regenerated fibres. The oldest regenerated fibres are viscose and rayon, produced in the 19th century. The first industrial processes used a large amount of wood as raw material, as well as harmful chemicals and water. Later the process of regenerating fibres developed to reduce the use of raw materials, chemicals, water and energy.

In the 1990s the first more sustainable regenerated fibres, e.g. Lyocell, entered the market with the commercial name of Tencel. The production process uses wood cellulose and it processes the fibre without harmful chemicals.

The next generation of regenerated fibres are under development. The production processes use less or no chemicals, and the water consumption is also diminished.

Issues

Degrowth, green growth and circular economy 

The bioeconomy has largely been associated with visions of "green growth". A study found that a "circular bioeconomy" may be "necessary to build a carbon neutral future in line with the climate objectives of the Paris Agreement". However, some are concerned that with a focus or reliance on technological progress a fundamentally unsustainable socioeconomic model might be maintained rather than be changed. Some are concerned it that may not lead to a ecologization of the economy but to an economization of the biological, "the living" and caution that potentials of non-bio-based techniques to achieve greater sustainability need to be considered. A study found that the, as of 2019, current EU interpretation of the bioeconomy is "diametrically opposite to the original narrative of Baranoff and Georgescu-Roegen that told us that expanding the share of activities based on renewable resources in the economy would slow down economic growth and set strict limits on the overall expansion of the economy". Furthermore, some caution that "Silicon Valley and food corporations" could use bioeconomy technologies for greenwashing and monopoly-concentrations. The bioeconomy, its potentials, disruptive new modes of production and innovations may distract from the need for systemic structural socioeconomic changes and provide a false illusion of technocapitalist utopianism/optimism that suggests technological fixes may make it possible to sustain contemporary patterns and structures, pre-empting structural changes.

Unemployment and work reallocation

Many farmers depend on conventional methods of producing crops and many of them live in developing economies. Cellular agriculture for products such as synthetic coffee could, if the contemporary socioeconomic context (the socioeconomic system's mechanisms such as incentives and resource distribution mechanisms like markets) remains unaltered (e.g. in nature, purposes, scopes, limits and degrees), threaten their employment and livelihoods as well as the respective nation's economy and social stability. A study concluded that "given the expertise required and the high investment costs of the innovation, it seems unlikely that cultured meat immediately benefits the poor in developing countries" and emphasized that animal agriculture is often essential for the subsistence for farmers in poor countries. However, not only developing countries may be affected.

Patents, intellectual property and monopolies 
Observers worry that the bioeconomy will become as opaque and free of accountability as the industry it attempts to replace, that is the current food system. The fear is that its core products will be mass-produced, nutritionally dubious meat sold at the homogeneous fast-food joints of the future.

The medical community has warned that gene patents can inhibit the practice of medicine and progress of science. This can also apply to other areas where patents and private intellectual property licenses are being used, often entirely preventing the use and continued development of knowledge and techniques for many years or decades. On the other hand, some worry that without intellectual property protection as the type of R&D-incentive, particularly to current degrees and extents, companies would no longer have the resources or motives/incentives to perform competitive, viable biotech research – as otherwise they may not be able to generate sufficient returns from initial R&D investment or less returns than from other expenditures that are possible. "Biopiracy" refers to "the use of intellectual property systems to legitimize the exclusive ownership and control over biological resources and biological products that have been used over centuries in non-industrialized cultures".

Rather than leading to sustainable, healthy, inexpensive, safe, accessible food being produced with little labor locally – after knowledge- and technology transfer and timely, efficient innovation – the bioeconomy may lead to aggressive monopoly-formation and exacerbated inequality. For instance, while production costs may be minimal, costs – including of medicine – may be high.

Innovation management, public spending and governance 

It has been argued that public investment would be a tool governments should use to regulate and license cellular agriculture. Private firms and venture capital would likely seek to maximise investor value rather than social welfare. Moreover, radical innovation is considered to be more risky, "and likely involves more information asymmetry, so that private financial markets may imperfectly manage these frictions". Governments may also help to coordinate "since several innovators may be needed to push the knowledge frontier and make the market profitable, but no single company wants to make the early necessary investments". And investments in the relevant sectors seem to be an bottleneck hindering the transition toward a bioeconomy.
Governments could also help innovators that lack the network "to naturally obtain the visibility and political influence necessary to obtain public funds" and could help determine relevant laws.
By establishing supporting infrastructure for entrepreneurial ecosystems they can help creating a beneficial environment for innovative bioeconomy startups. Enabling such bioeconomy startups to act on the opportunities provided through the bioeconomy transformation further contributes to its success.

In popular media 
Biopunk – so called due to similarity with cyberpunk – is a genre of science fiction that often thematizes the bioeconomy as well as its potential issues and technologies. The novel The Windup Girl portrays a society driven by a ruthless bioeconomy and ailing under climate change. In the more recent novel Change Agent prevalent black market clinics offer wealthy people unauthorized human genetic enhancement services and e.g. custom narcotics are 3D-printed locally or smuggled with soft robots. Solarpunk is another emerging genre that focuses on the relationship between human societies and the environment and also addresses many of the bioeconomy's issues and technologies such as genetic engineering, synthetic meat and commodification.

See also 

 Bioremediation
 Biosynthesis
 Chemurgy
 Cross-laminated timber
 Degrowth
 Digital economy
 European Green Deal
 Plyscraper
 Oleochemical
 Open innovation
 Single-cell protein
 Synthetic ivory
 Straw-bale construction
 Timeline of biotechnology
 Wood frame building
 Working animal

References

External links
 
 Food and Agriculture Organization of the United Nations: Sustainable and circular bioeconomy

Biotechnology
Alternative energy economy
Industries (economics)
Sustainable development
Economy by field